The 2018–19 season was the 141st in the history of Wolverhampton Wanderers and the 2nd under then-head coach Nuno Espírito Santo. In that season, they returned to the Premier League for the first time since being relegated in 2012 via winning the previous season's EFL Championship. They also reached their first knockout competition semi-final in 21 years through their participation in the FA Cup semi-finals.

The club finished in 7th place, their highest position in the English league system since 1979–80 and the highest of any newly-promoted team since Ipswich Town finished 5th in the 2000–01 season. As a result of Manchester City winning all 3 domestic trophies on offer that season, this league position gained them a place in the UEFA Europa League second qualifying round, invoking the club's first continental participation since the 1980–81 season.

Pre-season friendlies

Competitions

Premier League

A total of 20 teams competed in the Premier League in the 2018–19 season. Each team played every other team twice, once at their stadium, and once at the opposition's. Three points were awarded to teams for each win, one point per draw, and none for defeats.

League table

Results summary

Results by matchday

Results
The provisional fixture list was released on 14 June 2018, but was subject to change in the event of matches being selected for television coverage or police concerns.

FA Cup

The third round draw was made live on the BBC by Ruud Gullit and Paul Ince from Stamford Bridge on 3 December. The fourth round draw was made live on the BBC by Robbie Keane and Carl Ikeme following Wolves' third round victory on 7 January. The fifth round draw was made live on the BBC by Ian Wright and Alex Scott on 28 January. The draw for the quarter-final was made on 18 February by Darren Fletcher and Wayne Bridge. The draw for the semi-finals was made live on the BBC on 17 March by Jimmy Floyd Hasselbaink and Leon Osman.

EFL Cup

The second round draw was made from the Stadium of Light on 16 August. The third round draw was made on 30 August 2018 by David Seaman and Joleon Lescott.

EFL Trophy

Wolves were one of the sixteen teams from outside the bottom two divisions of the Football League to be invited to field their academy team in the competition due to it holding Category 1 academy status. They were drawn into Group H in the Northern section. In matches level at the end of 90 minutes, a penalty shoot-out was held with the winner earning a bonus point.

Group table

Players

First team squad

 HG = Homegrown Player
 U21 = Under-21 Player (born on or after 1 January 1997)
 Players in italics out on loan during the season

Statistics

|-
|align="left"|||align="left"|||align="left"| 
|||4||||4||1||0||||8||5||0
|-
|align="left"|||align="left"|||align="left"|  
|34||1||4||0||||0||||1||12||0||
|-
|align="left"|||align="left"|||align="left"|  ¤ †
|||0||||0||0||0||0||0||0||0||
|-
|align="left"|||align="left"|||align="left"| 
|||3||||2||1||0||||5||1||0||
|-
|align="left"|||align="left"|||align="left"|  
|||4||||1||0||0||||5||10||0||
|-
|align="left"|||align="left"|||style="background:#faecc8; text-align:left;"|  ‡
|||13||||4||0||0||style="background:#98FB98"|||17||4||0||
|-
|align="left"|10||align="left"|||align="left"|  
|||1||||0||||1||||2||3||0||
|-
|align="left"|11||align="left"|||align="left"| 
|37||0||||0||0||0||style="background:#98FB98"|37||0||1||0||
|-
|align="left"|14||align="left"|||align="left"|  ¤
|||0||||0||0||0||||0||0||0||
|-
|align="left"|15||align="left"|||align="left"|  
|36||4||5||0||0||0||41||4||3||1||
|-
|align="left"|16||align="left"|||align="left"| 
|38||0||6||0||2||0||46||0||6||0||
|-
|align="left"|17||align="left"|||align="left"| 
|||0||||0||2||0||||0||2||0||
|-
|align="left"|18||align="left"|||align="left"| 
|||9||3||1||||0||||10||12||0||
|-
|align="left"|19||align="left"|||style="background:#faecc8; text-align:left;"|  ‡
|||1||5||0||1||0||style="background:#98FB98"|||1||6||0||
|-
|align="left"|21||align="left"|||align="left"| 
|||0||6||0||2||0||||0||0||0||
|-
|align="left"|23||align="left"|||align="left"| 
|||0||1||0||0||0||style="background:#98FB98"|||0||0||0||
|-
|align="left"|24||align="left"|||align="left"|  ¤
|||0||||0||||0||style="background:#98FB98"|||0||0||0||
|-
|align="left"|25||align="left"|||align="left"| 
|||0||||0||1||0||style="background:#98FB98"|||0||0||0||
|-
|align="left"|26||align="left"|||align="left"| 
|||0||||0||||0||style="background:#98FB98"|||0||0||0||
|-
|align="left"|27||align="left"|||align="left"| 
|||2||5||0||2||0||||2||8||0||
|-
|align="left"|28||align="left"|||align="left"| 
|||1||||0||0||0||style="background:#98FB98"|||1||5||0||
|-
|align="left"|29||align="left"|||align="left"| 
|||0||||0||2||0||||0||1||0||
|-
|align="left"|30||align="left"|||align="left"| 
|||0||||0||2||0||||0||0||0||
|-
|align="left"|31||align="left"|||align="left"|  
|||0||||0||0||0||||0||0||0||
|-
|align="left"|32||align="left"|||style="background:#faecc8; text-align:left;"|  ‡
|||2||5||0||2||0||style="background:#98FB98"|||2||1||0||
|-
|align="left"|33||align="left"|||align="left"| 
|||0||||0||2||1||||1||0||0||
|-
|align="left"|37||align="left"|||align="left"| 
|||1||||0||2||0||style="background:#98FB98"|||1||1||0||
|-
|align="left"|38||align="left"|||align="left"|  
|||0||||0||0||0||||0||0||0||
|-
|align="left"|45||align="left"|||align="left"| 
|||0||||0||0||0||style="background:#98FB98"|||0||0||0||
|-
|align="left"|47||align="left"|||align="left"|  
|||0||||0||0||0||||0||0||0||
|-
|align="left"|49||align="left"|||align="left"|  
|||0||||0||0||0||style="background:#98FB98"|||0||0||0||
|-
|}

Awards

Transfers

In

Loans in

Out

Loans out

Loan returns

Released
As of 30 January 2019.

References

Wolverhampton Wanderers
Wolverhampton Wanderers F.C. seasons